The Premier Division (known as the Mowi Premiership) is the premier division in shinty. Based in Scotland and formed in 1996, the league is the top tier of the Shinty league system. Set-up in order to create a Scotland-wide league for the first time, it constitutes as one of the five trophies considered to be part of the Grand Slam of shinty.

The 2022 Mowi Premiership was won by Kingussie Camanachd.

Sponsorship 
From 2009 until 2011, the league was sponsored by Scottish Hydro Electric before the Orion Group took over for the 2012 season. That same year the league was rebranded under the current 'Premiership' branding with current sponsors Marine Harvest taking the helm at the beginning of the 2015 season. In 2019, Marine Harvest rebranded as Mowi ASA, with the league being known as the Mowi Premiership.

Teams 
The 2023 Mowi Premiership consists of the following teams:

Beauly Shinty Club
Caberfeidh Camanachd Club
Glasgow Mid Argyll
Kingussie Camanachd
Kingussie Camanachd
Kinlochshiel Shinty Club
Kyles Athletic Shinty Club

Lovat Shinty Club
Newtonmore Camanachd Club
Oban Camanachd
Skye Camanachd

History

1996: The then Premier Division had its inaugural season. Prior to its founding the winners of North Division One and South Division One played in a National Final.

1999: Promotion and Relegation between Premier Division and National Division One adopted

2003: An interim league system contested while the Shinty League system transitioned from being played during winter months to summer months.

2004: The Premier Division becomes a summer season league.

2006: National Division One folded at end of season ending Promotion and Relegation. Fort William break Kingussie's dominance dated back to 1986 by taking home the Premier Division title.

2007: Kingussie recapture the Premier Division.

2009: Title won on final weekend by Kingussie on goal difference. Newtonmore finishing second.

2010: For the second consecutive year league decided on final weekend through goal difference. A dramatic final round game between Fort William and Newtonmore saw Newtonmore victors and champions after an 80th-minute goal by Danny MacRae.

2011: Newtonmore become first team other than Kingussie to retain the Premier Division. Kyles Athletic title dreams dashed with final minute goal along with hopes of being first South team to win the league.

2014: National Division One reinstated along with the pyramid system (Promotion and Relegation).

2016: Newtonmore make it seven in a row having also won the Camanachd Cup and MacTavish Cup.

2017: Newtonmore lost their first league match in two years. Kinlochshiel won their inaugural championship to become only the second club from outside Badenoch to win the title.

2018: Newtonmore Camanachd recapture the Premier Division title.

2019: Kingussie win their first title for ten years.

List of Champions
1996 - Kingussie Camanachd
1997 - Kingussie Camanachd
1998 - Kingussie Camanachd
1999 - Kingussie Camanachd
2000 - Kingussie Camanachd
2001 - Kingussie Camanachd
2002 - Kingussie Camanachd
2003 - (Interim Leagues while transitioning from winter to summer season)
2004 - Kingussie Camanachd
2005 - Kingussie Camanachd
2006 - Fort William Shinty Club
2007 - Kingussie Camanachd
2008 - Kingussie Camanachd
2009 - Kingussie Camanachd
2010 - Newtonmore Camanachd Club
2011 - Newtonmore Camanachd Club
2012 - Newtonmore Camanachd Club
2013 - Newtonmore Camanachd Club
2014 - Newtonmore Camanachd Club
2015 - Newtonmore Camanachd Club
2016 - Newtonmore Camanachd Club
2017 - Kinlochshiel Shinty Club
2018 - Newtonmore Camanachd Club
2019 - Kingussie Camanachd
2020 - No season due to COVID-19 pandemic
2021 - N/A
2022 - Kingussie Camanachd

References

External links
Marine Harvest Premiership on shinty.com

Shinty competitions